The 1990 Artistic Gymnastics World Cup Final was held in Brussels, Belgium in 1990.

Medal winners

Women's results

All-around

Vault Final

Uneven Bars

Balance Beam

Floor Exercise

References

1990
Artistic Gymnastics World Cup
International gymnastics competitions hosted by Belgium
1990 in Belgian sport